Prajwal Giri, born as Bishnu Giri on 23 August 1987 is a Nepali film actor who has appeared in Nepali language films. He is known for his wide range of roles in the Nepali movies.
Prajwal debuted in Nataa Mann Ko and then played a lead role in many movies. His superhit movies are Chhal, Jay Parshuam, Sakas, Timi Jaha bhaepani, Jai Parshuram, Mero Desh, Sanjog etc.

Early life
Prajwol was born in Sindupalchok, kadambas-4. His family moved to Kathmandu later. He studied at Shree Kalidevi School and later completed his college study at Baneshwor College and Nepal commerce college. A very good student in school, With the desire of becoming an actor, he started taking acting lessons.  He started taking acting lessons, a theater troupe with whom Prajwol has participated in several street plays as well.

Career
He was working on theater since 2002. He was working on Television serials like dui thopa aasu, miss Nepal and Jindagaani etc . His first lead role was in Nataa Man Ko. The Movie was a highest grossing and National Level Award winning film .

Filmography

Award

References

1987 births
Living people
21st-century Nepalese male actors
People from Kathmandu District